Janewali is a small village in Sialkot District in the Punjab province of Pakistan. 

Villages in Sialkot District